Swiss Lips is the self-titled debut album by Manchester band, Swiss Lips, released on 16 March 2015. It was released on the label Foreverever/BMG.

The album was produced and mixed by Ric Levy and recorded in Manchester and London. Artwork by Tom Ashlee featuring Ellie Hook.

Critical reception 

MTV Iggy writes, "Their self-titled album, out March 15, is exploding with flashy electropop enthusiasm" and "Keyboardist Tim Estherby’s opening synth is like a beam of fluorescent light announcing frontman Sam Hammond's zealous call for youthful abandon; surrender is inevitable, and pretty blissful. 'Honey' serves a similarly sized slice of shimmery liberation, and 'Diamonds' is as crystalline as its name implies"

Track listing

References

2015 debut albums